Strength in Numbers may refer to:

Albums
Strength in Numbers (24-7 Spyz album), 1992
Strength in Numbers (38 Special album), 1986
Strength in Numbers (Calla album), 2007
Strength in Numbers (The Haunted album), 2017
Strength in Numbers (The Music album), 2008
Strength in Numbers (Tyketto album), 1994

Songs
"Strength in Numbers" (song), by The Music from the above album
"Strength in Numbers", a song by Times of Grace
"Strength in Numbers", a song by In Fear and Faith from their album Your World on Fire
"Strength in Numbers", a song by Luba from her album Between the Earth & Sky

Other uses
Strength in Numbers (band), a bluegrass supergroup